The DFB-Pokal 2014–15 was the 35th season of the cup competition, Germany's second-most important title in women's football.

Wolfsburg won their second title after beating Frankfurt 3–0 in the final.

Results

First Round 
The draw for the first round was held on 24 July 2014, it was divided into a Northern and Southern draw. The top eight teams from the last Bundesliga season received a bye to the second round. The other four Bundesliga teams all advanced.

Second Round 
The draw for the second round will be held on 30 August 2014. The eight best placed Bundesliga teams from last season entered this round. The round was drawn in a Northern and Southern group.

Freiburg versus Hoffenheim is the only Bundesliga pairing. The matches will be played on 27th or 28 September.

North

|}
South

|}

Round of 16 
The draw for the round of 16 was held on 20 October 2014.

|}

Quarterfinals 
Draw was held on 8 November 2014. Gütersloh and Köln are the remaining 2. Bundesliga clubs, the other six play in the top tier. Silke Rottenberg, the former German football goalkeeper, will perform the draw.

|}

Semifinals 

|}

Final

Top scorers
Final statistics.

References

Women
Pok
2014-15